Gone, Gone, Forever Gone, also known as Gate, gate, paragate, is a 1996 Vietnamese drama film directed by Hồ Quang Minh. The film was selected as the Vietnamese entry for the Best Foreign Language Film at the 69th Academy Awards, but it was not nominated.

Cast

 Phương Dung as Diệu Thuần
 Lê Tuấn Anh as Sơn
 Hoàng Phúc as Quang
 Nguyễn Thị Quý as Diệu Thông
 Anh Thư 
 Lê Hoá as Diệu Vân
 Thuý Hoà as Điệu Tịnh Bình
 Nhật Cường
 Khánh Duy as Uy
 Thế Hà as Kiên
 Huỳnh Đắc Vinh
 Ngọc Bình
 Thuý Hồng as Diệu Thanh
 Lê Ngọc Tú 
 Bảo Phúc
 Trương Thị Thuỷ 
 Lê Công Đào
 Thanh Trì
 Thành Nguyên
 Văn Kiệp 
 Ba Lân

See also
 List of submissions to the 69th Academy Awards for Best Foreign Language Film
 List of Vietnamese submissions for the Academy Award for Best Foreign Language Film

References

External links
 

1996 films
1996 drama films
Vietnamese-language films
Vietnamese drama films